Shari Wiseman is an American neuroscientist and the editor in chief of Nature Neuroscience.

Education 
Wiseman has two PhDs from Yale University and undertook postdoctoral research at the Beth Israel-Deaconess Medical Center where she worked on animal models of autism spectrum disorders. After that, she undertook postdoctoral training at Tufts University where she focused on the regulation of GABAB receptors by excitotoxic stimuli.

Career 
She has worked at Nature Neuroscience since 2017, as an associate editor, becoming the editor in chief in 2021.

Selected publications 

 Senescence in Down syndrome NPCs, Nature Neuroscience, 2022 Feb;25(2):131. doi: 10.1038/s41593-022-01016-6. PMID 35132233

Personal life 
Wiseman lives in New York City. She is a mother of two children.

References 

Living people
Yale University alumni
Academic journal editors
American women neuroscientists
Tufts University alumni
Year of birth missing (living people)